Shailyashikhar Municipality is a municipality located in Darchula District of Sudurpashchim Province of Nepal.

The municipality was established on 10 March 2017, when Government of Nepal announced 744 local level units as per the new constitution of Nepal 2015. Sikhar, Dethala, Ranisikhar, Gwami, Boharigau and Gokuleshwar villages were merged to form this new local level unit. Gokuleshwar was declared the admin headquarters. The municipality is divided into total 9 wards.

References

External links
 http://103.69.124.141/gis
 http://www.shailyashikharmun.gov.np/
 http://mofald.gov.np/sites/default/files/News_Notices/Final%20District%201-75%20Corrected%20Last%20for%20RAJPATRA.pdf
Municipalities in Darchula District
Nepal municipalities established in 2017